Asala may refer to:
 Armenian Secret Army for the Liberation of Armenia, an Armenian militant organization
 Asalah Nasri, Syrian singer
 Asala Party, a Salafist political party in Egypt
 Al Asalah, a Salafist political party in Bahrain
 Asalha Puja, a Theravada Buddhist festival which typically takes place in July, on the full moon of the eighth lunar month